Amphion was a 50-gun ship of the line of the French Navy.

Career 
Amphion took part in the Battle of Ushant on 27 July 1778 under Keredern de Trobriand.
 Seriously damaged, Amphion returned to Brest while the fight was still raging, carrying the first news of the battle. In consequence, Trobriand was replaced at the command of Amphion.

She took part in the Battle of Grenada on 6 July 1779, where her captain, Ferron du Quengo, was killed. The same month, she ran aground at Cap-Haïtien at Saint-Domingue.

Amphion took part in the action of 20 March 1780, along with Annibal, Diadème and Réfléchi.

Fate 
Amphion was broken up in Rochefort in 1787.

Notes, citations, and references 
Notes

Citations

Bibliography
 
 
 

Ships of the line of the French Navy
1749 ships